In Parts Assembled Solely is the fourth EP by Spahn Ranch, released on May 21, 1996 by Cleopatra Records. It comprises six remixes and four live versions of tracks from the band's 1995 album The Coiled One.

Reception
In his review of In Parts Assembled Solely, Jon Worley of Aiding & Abetting noted that "the only remix that outdoes the original is the first track" and "the live tracks prove that Spahn Ranch can play live, I guess, but they are completely redundant." CMJ New Music Monthly listed the EP as the top "Family Album", which offers a list of releases to listen to with one's relatives. Sonic Boom pointed to the live tracks as being the highlight of the album, saying "the sound quality isn't all that great, yet the live tracks have a raw emotional context to them which they lack in the studio versions."

Track listing

Accolades

Personnel
Adapted from the In Parts Assembled Solely liner notes.

Spahn Ranch
 Athan Maroulis – lead vocals
 Matt Green – sampler, keyboards
 Harry Lewis – percussion

Additional performers
 Kent Bancroft – live guitar
 Michael Hillerup – remix (1, 6)
 David Parkinson (as David Glass) – percussion
 Kim Løhde Petersen – remix (1, 6)
 Timothy Wiles (as Überzone) – remix (2-4)

Production and design
 Judson Leach – engineering, mixing, remix (5)

Release history

References

External links 
 In Parts Assembled Solely at iTunes
 In Parts Assembled Solely at Discogs (list of releases)

1996 EPs
Remix EPs
Spahn Ranch (band) albums
Cleopatra Records EPs